Nepenthes mirabilis (from Latin mirabilis "wonderful"), or the common swamp pitcher-plant and tropical pitcher plant, is a carnivorous plant species. By far the most widespread of all Nepenthes, its range covers continental Southeast Asia and all major islands of the Malay Archipelago (minus the Lesser Sunda Islands and northern Philippines), stretching from China in the north to Australia in the south. The species exhibits great variability throughout its range. One of the more notable varieties, N. mirabilis var. echinostoma, is endemic to Brunei and Sarawak and possesses an extremely wide peristome.

The conservation status of N. mirabilis is listed as Least Concern on the IUCN Red List. In Hong Kong, it is a protected species under Forestry Regulations Cap. 96A.

According to Matthew Jebb and Martin Cheek, the pitchers of N. mirabilis are used as toy phallocrypts in New Guinea.

Distribution
Nepenthes mirabilis has by far the widest distribution of any Nepenthes species and is known from the following countries and regions: Australia (Cape York Peninsula), Borneo, Cambodia, Caroline Islands (Palau and Yap), China (Guangdong Province, Hainan, Hong Kong, and Macau), D'Entrecasteaux Islands, Java, Laos, Louisiade Archipelago, Maluku Islands, Myanmar, New Guinea, Peninsular Malaysia, Philippines (Dinagat and Mindanao), Sulawesi, Sumatra, Thailand, and Vietnam. It has also been recorded from many smaller islands, including Babi, Bangka, Banyak Islands, Batu Islands, Bengkalis, Enggano, Ko Lanta, Ko Tarutao, Langkawi, Mendol, Mentawai Islands (North Pagai, Siberut, Sipura, and South Pagai), Meranti Islands (Padang, Rangsang, and Tebing Tinggi), Nias, Penang, Phuket, Riau Islands (Lingga Islands and Riau Archipelago), Rupat, Tawi-Tawi, and possibly Wowoni.

Taxonomy
Nepenthes mirabilis is closely related to N. rowaniae, N. tenax and N. parvula, the only three Nepenthes species endemic to Australia.

In his Carnivorous Plant Database, taxonomist Jan Schlauer treats N. kongkandana as a synonym of N. mirabilis.

Infraspecific taxa
Across its range, N. mirabilis exhibits great variability in terms of pitcher morphology and colour, and it has the most synonyms of all Nepenthes species. The following forms and varieties of N. mirabilis have been described. With the exception of N. mirabilis var. echinostoma and N. mirabilis var. globosa, these taxa are not considered valid today.

Nepenthes mirabilis f. anamensis (Hort.Weiner) Hort.Westphal (1991)
Nepenthes mirabilis var. anamensis Hort.Weiner in sched. (1985) nom.nud.
Nepenthes mirabilis var. biflora J.H.Adam & Wilcock (1992)
Nepenthes mirabilis var. echinostoma (Hook.f.) Hort.Slack ex J.H.Adam & Wilcock (1992)
Nepenthes mirabilis var. globosa M.Catal. (2010)
Nepenthes mirabilis f. simensis (Hort.Weiner) Hort.Westphal (1991)
Nepenthes mirabilis var. simensis Hort.Weiner in sched. (1985) nom.nud.
Nepenthes mirabilis f. smilesii (Hemsl.) Hort.Westphal (2000)
Nepenthes mirabilis var. smilesii (Hemsl.) Hort.Weiner in sched. (1985)

N. mirabilis var. echinostoma

Nepenthes mirabilis var. echinostoma was discovered by Odoardo Beccari in 1865 and described as a species, N. echinostoma, by Joseph Dalton Hooker in 1873. In 1882, Frederick William Burbidge described this unusual variety in The Gardeners' Chronicle as follows:

Beccari's singular N. echinostoma (vide Herb. Kew) is a wonderful thing, as yet unintroduced—indeed, I suppose unseen by any save Beccari ! The mouths of the urns remind one of the deflexed teeth of some gigantic moss of the Hypnoid section.

Nepenthes mirabilis var. echinostoma is the only form of this species that occurs in Brunei. It has also been recorded from parts of Sarawak, but appears to be completely absent from Sabah.

N. mirabilis var. globosa

Nepenthes mirabilis var. globosa has been recorded from a single undisclosed Andaman Sea island off Phang Nga and from the Thai mainland near the city of Trang.

This variety was featured on the cover of the January 2006 issue of the Journal of Insectivorous Plant Society, identified as "Nepenthes sp. from Thailand". The name Nepenthes globosa appeared in print in an article by Shigeo Kurata in the July 2007 issue of the Journal of Insectivorous Plant Society. The same issue also featured an article by Masahiro Tada that referred to the plant as "Nepenthes Viking". Prior to its description by Marcello Catalano in 2010, this taxon was also published under the informal name Nepenthes sp. Phanga Nga in Stewart McPherson's 2009 book, Pitcher Plants of the Old World.

In the horticultural trade, this variety is popularly known as both Nepenthes globosa (from Latin: globosus, "globular") and Nepenthes sp. Viking, after the resemblance the pitchers bear to the prow of a Viking ship.

Pitcher infauna
A great number of infaunal organisms have been found in the pitchers of this species. These include the sarcophagid fly Sarcophaga papuensis and the mite Nepenthacarus warreni, which have both been found in Australian populations of the plant. Similarly, the mosquitoes Aedes dybasi and Aedes maehleri reside in the pitchers of N. mirabilis on the islands of Palau and Yap, respectively. Both have unusual life histories and morphological traits associated with this habit.

The nematode Baujardia mirabilis has been described from N. mirabilis in Thailand. It is not thought to be an accidental; the pitchers of this species appear to be the nematode's natural habitat. The microecosystems in these pitchers were found to be dominated by mosquito larvae, midges, and B. mirabilis. It is speculated that this nematode might have a phoretic relationship with one or more infaunal insect species.

In southern China, tree frogs have been observed in the pitchers of N. mirabilis. The amphibians do not fall prey to the plant, but rather feed on insects that are caught by the pitchers. They are not affected by the acidic digestive juices (which may have a pH as low as 2), likely due to the mucilaginous outer layer of their skin.

The first record of an aquatic fungus living in the pitcher organ of a carnivorous plant came from a specimen of N. mirabilis growing along the Jardine River in Australia. The mycelial fungus was observerd as both free-living in the trap's fluid and attached to chitinous insect remains.

The pitchers of N. mirabilis have also been found to harbour a complex community of bacteria. These bacterial communities appear to be more diverse than those found in the pitcher fluid of N. ampullaria and sympatric N. gracilis in Peninsular Malaysia. In N. mirabilis their composition can also differ significantly according to pitcher type, something not seen in the other two species.

Natural hybrids
Nepenthes mirabilis has the greatest number of known natural hybrids of any species in the genus.

? (N. alata × N. merrilliana) × N. mirabilis [=N. × tsangoya]
N. alata × N. mirabilis [=N. × mirabilata]
N. ampullaria × N. mirabilis [=N. × kuchingensis, Nepenthes cutinensis]
? (N. ampullaria × N. rafflesiana) × N. mirabilis [=N. × hookeriana × N. mirabilis]
N. andamana × N. mirabilis (including N. andamana × N. mirabilis var. globosa)
N. benstonei × N. mirabilis
N. bicalcarata × N. mirabilis (including N. bicalcarata × N. mirabilis var. echinostoma)
? (N. bicalcarata × N. rafflesiana) × N. mirabilis var. echinostoma
N. gracilis × N. mirabilis [=N. × sharifah-hapsahii, N. × ghazallyana, N. × grabilis, N. neglecta?]
N. insignis × N. mirabilis
N. kampotiana × N. mirabilis
N. kongkandana × N. mirabilis
N. merrilliana × N. mirabilis
N. mirabilis × N. northiana
N. mirabilis × N. rafflesiana (including N. mirabilis var. echinostoma × N. rafflesiana)
N. mirabilis × N. reinwardtiana
N. mirabilis × N. rowaniae
N. mirabilis × N. smilesii
N. mirabilis × N. spathulata
N. mirabilis × N. sumatrana
N. mirabilis × N. tenax
N. mirabilis × N. thorelii
N. mirabilis × N. tomoriana

Notes

a.Nepenthes mirabilis was first described under the Linnaean taxonomic system as Phyllamphora mirabilis by João de Loureiro in 1790. It was then transferred to the genus Nepenthes under the incorrect combination Nepenthes phyllamphora by Carl Ludwig Willdenow in 1805. Most sources attribute the earliest publication of the correct binomial—Nepenthes mirabilis—to George Claridge Druce in 1916, but Jan Schlauer's Carnivorous Plant Database records a much earlier publication by Rafarin in 1869.

References

 Adam, J.H. & C.C. Wilcock 1992. Nepenthes mirabilis (Loureiro) Druce from Borneo. Malayan Nature Journal 46(2): 75–84.
 Bourke, G. & R. Nunn 2012. Nepenthes. In: Australian Carnivorous Plants. Redfern Natural History Productions, Poole. pp. 148–167.
 Clarke, C.M. 2001. A Guide to the Pitcher Plants of Sabah. Natural History Publications (Borneo), Kota Kinabalu.
 Clarke, C.M. 2006. Introduction. In: Danser, B.H. The Nepenthaceae of the Netherlands Indies. Natural History Publications (Borneo), Kota Kinabalu. pp. 1–15.
 Co, L. & W. Suarez 2012. Nepenthaceae. Co's Digital Flora of the Philippines.
  Gronemeyer, T. 2008. Nepenthes auf den Philippinen – Ein Reisebericht. Das Taublatt 60(1): 15–27.
 Hernawati & P. Akhriadi 2006. A Field Guide to the Nepenthes of Sumatra. PILI-NGO Movement, Bogor.
 Korthals, P.W. 1839. Over het geslacht Nepenthes. In: C.J. Temminck 1839–1842. Verhandelingen over de Natuurlijke Geschiedenis der Nederlandsche overzeesche bezittingen; Kruidkunde. Leiden. pp. 1–44, t. 1–4, 13–15, 20–22.
 Lowrie, A. 1998. Nepenthes mirabilis. In: Carnivorous Plants of Australia. Volume 3. University of Western Australia Press, Nedlands. pp. 276–279.
 Lowrie, A. 2013. Nepenthes mirabilis (Lour.) Druce. In: Carnivorous Plants of Australia Magnum Opus - Volume Three. Redfern Natural History Productions, Poole. pp. 902–905.
 Macfarlane, J.M. 1927. The Philippine species of Nepenthes. The Philippine Journal of Science 33(2): 127–140.
  McPherson, S. & T. Gronemeyer 2008. Die Nepenthesarten der Philippinen Eine Fotodokumentation. Das Taublatt 60(1): 34–78.
 Nunn, R. & C.N.A. Vu 2016. An account of the Nepenthes species of Vietnam. Carnivorous Plant Newsletter 45(3): 93–101.
  Oikawa, T. 1992. Nepenthes mirabilis Druce. In: . [The Grief Vanishing.] Parco Co., Japan. pp. 26–29.
 Shivas, R.G. 1984. Pitcher Plants of Peninsular Malaysia & Singapore. Maruzen Asia, Kuala Lumpur.
 Thorogood, C. 2010. The Malaysian Nepenthes: Evolutionary and Taxonomic Perspectives. Nova Science Publishers, New York.
 Nepenthes of Australia by Stewart McPherson

Further reading

 [Anonymous] 1877. Reports of Societies. Royal Horticultural. The Gardeners' Chronicle 8(197): 441.
 [Anonymous] 2010. Eramet-PT Weda Bay Nickel Exploration and Development ESIA. ERM Indonesia, Jakarta. 
 Adam, J.H. 1997.  Pertanika Journal of Tropical Agricultural Science 20(2–3): 121–134.
 Adam, J.H. & C.C. Wilcock 1999.  Pertanika Journal of Tropical Agricultural Science 22(1): 1–7.
 Adam, J.H., C.C. Wilcock & M.D. Swaine 1989. Ecology and taxonomy of Bornean Nepenthes. University of Aberdeen Tropical Biology Newsletter 56: 2–4.
 Adam, J.H., C.C. Wilcock & M.D. Swaine 1992.  Journal of Tropical Forest Science 5(1): 13–25.
 Adam, J.H., E.M. Nurulhuda, H. Abdul-Halim, O. Abdul-Rahim, A.H. Hafiza, G.K. Gopir, L.M. Pilik, R. Omar, M.B. Qasim, J. Salimon, S. Abdul-Rahim & M.M. Hanafiah 2005. Pitcher plants recorded from BRIS forest in Jambu Bongkok, Kuala Trengganu, Malaysia. Wetland Science 3(3): 183–189.
  Akhriadi, P. 2007. Kajian taksonomi hibrid alami Nepenthes (Nepenthaceae) di Kerinci. Working paper, Andalas University, Padang. Abstract 
  Baloari, G., R. Linda & Mukarlina 2013. Keanekaragaman jenis dan pola distribusi Nepenthes spp di Gunung Semahung Kecamatan Sengah Temila Kabupaten Landak. Protobiont 2(1): 1–6. Abstract 
 Bauer, U., C.J. Clemente, T. Renner & W. Federle 2012. Form follows function: morphological diversification and alternative trapping strategies in carnivorous Nepenthes pitcher plants. Journal of Evolutionary Biology 25(1): 90–102. 
 Beaman, J.H. & C. Anderson 2004. The Plants of Mount Kinabalu: 5. Dicotyledon Families Magnoliaceae to Winteraceae. Natural History Publications (Borneo), Kota Kinabalu.
 Bednar, B.L. 1983.   Carnivorous Plant Newsletter 12(3): 64.
 Bednar, B.L. 1985.  Carnivorous Plant Newsletter 14(4): 91.
 Bednar, B.L. 1985.  Carnivorous Plant Newsletter 14(4): 105–106.
 Benz, M.J., E.V. Gorb & S.N. Gorb 2012. Diversity of the slippery zone microstructure in pitchers of nine carnivorous Nepenthes taxa. Arthropod-Plant Interactions 6(1): 147–158. 
 Beveridge, N.G.P., C. Rauch, P.J.A. Keßler, R.R. van Vugt & P.C. van Welzen 2013. A new way to identify living species of Nepenthes (Nepenthaceae): more data needed! Carnivorous Plant Newsletter 42(4): 122–128.
 Bonhomme, V., H. Pelloux-Prayer, E. Jousselin, Y. Forterre, J.-J. Labat & L. Gaume 2011. Slippery or sticky? Functional diversity in the trapping strategy of Nepenthes carnivorous plants. New Phytologist 191(2): 545–554. 
  Brongniart, A. 1824. Observations sur les genres Cytinus et Nepenthes. Annales des Sciences Naturelles 1: 29–52.
 Buch, F., M. Rott, S. Rottloff, C. Paetz, I. Hilke, M. Raessler & A. Mithöfer 2012. Secreted pitfall-trap fluid of carnivorous Nepenthes plants is unsuitable for microbial growth. Annals of Botany 111(3): 375–383. 
 Buch, F., Y. Pauchet, M. Rott & A. Mithöfer 2014. Characterization and heterologous expression of a PR-1 protein from traps of the carnivorous plant Nepenthes mirabilis. Phytochemistry 100: 43–50. 
 Burnett, J.B., M. Davies & G. Taylor (eds.) 2003. Flora and Fauna Survey of the Tangguh LNG Site Papua Province, Indonesia. P.T. Hatfindo Prima, Bogor. 
 Chaveerach, A., A. Tanomtong, R. Sudmoon & T. Tanee 2006. Genetic diversity among geographically separated populations of Nepenthes mirabilis. Biologia 61(3): 295–298. 
  Chen, J., P. Gao & Z. Gan 2003. 猪笼草的组织培养和快速繁殖. [Tissue culture and rapid propagation of Nepenthes mirabilis]. Plant Physiology Communications 39(1): 40.
 Clarke, C. 1995. Nepenthes mirabilis in Hong Kong. Bulletin of the Australian Carnivorous Plant Society, Inc. 14(2): 7–8.
 Clementi, G. 1843. Sull'aascidio della Nepenthes phyllamphora di Wildenow. Il Cimento  1(13–14): 217–220. 
  Corker, B. 1991. Germination et viabilité des graines de Nepenthes mirabilis. Dionée 24.
  Dinarti, D., U. Sayekti & Y. Alitalia 2009.  Seminar proceedings, Bogor Agricultural University, Bogor.
 Dixon, W.E. 1889. Nepenthes. The Gardeners' Chronicle, series 3, 6(144): 354.
  Enjelina, W. 2012. Analisis hibrid alam kantung semar (Nepenthes) di Bukit Taratak Kabupaten Pesisir Selatan Sumatera Barat dengan teknik RAPD. M.Sc. thesis, Andalas University, Padang. 
 Fashing, N.J. 2010.  In: M.W. Sabelis & J. Bruin (eds.) Trends in Acarology: Proceedings of the 12th International Congress. Springer Science, Dordrecht. pp. 81–84. 
  Feng, F., H. Li & J. Xie 2002. 猪笼草的组织培养. [Rapid propagation of Nepenthes mirabilis by tissue culture.] Chinese Journal of Tropical Crops 23(2): 62–65.
  Feng, F., H. Li & J. Xie 2002. 猪笼草的组织培养. [Tissue culture and rapid propagation of Nepenthes mirabilis.] Journal of Southwest Agricultural University 24(3): 268–270.
 Fretwell, S. 2008. Carnivorous plants in Thailand. Victorian Carnivorous Plant Society Inc. 90: 10–13.
 Fretwell, S. 2013. Rarely seen Cp’s from the north. Victorian Carnivorous Plant Society Inc. 110: 6–9.
 Grigg, S. 1995. Nepenthes mirabilis. Bulletin of the Australian Carnivorous Plant Society, Inc. 14(3): 4.
  Handayani, T. 1999.  [Conservation of Nepenthes in Indonesian botanic gardens.] In: A. Mardiastuti, I. Sudirman, K.G. Wiryawan, L.I. Sudirman, M.P. Tampubolon, R. Megia & Y. Lestari (eds.) Prosiding II: Seminar Hasil-Hasil Penelitian Bidang Ilmu Hayat. Pusat Antar Universitas Ilmu Hayat IPB, Bogor. pp. 365–372.
 Handayani, T., D. Latifah & Dodo 2005. Diversity and growth behaviour of Nepenthes (pitcher plants) in Tanjung Puting National Park, Central Kalimantan Province. Biodiversitas 6(4): 248–252 .  Cover 
 Hooker, J.D. 1859. XXXV. On the origin and development of the pitchers of Nepenthes, with an account of some new Bornean plants of that genus. The Transactions of the Linnean Society of London 22(4): 415–424. 
 Jala, A. 2011.  International Transaction Journal of Engineering, Management, & Applied Sciences & Technologies 2(1): 83–91.
 Kato, M., M. Hotta, R. Tamin & T. Itino 1993. Inter- and intra-specific variation in prey assemblages and inhabitant communities in Nepenthes pitchers in Sumatra. Tropical Zoology 6(1): 11–25. Abstract
 Kitching, R.L. 2000. Food Webs and Container Habitats: The natural history and ecology of phytotelmata. Cambridge University Press, Cambridge.
 Kruger, R. 2001. Nepenthes of Cape York (part 1). Bulletin of the Australian Carnivorous Plant Society 20(3): 13–17.
 Kruger, R. 2001. Nepenthes of Cape York (part 2). Bulletin of the Australian Carnivorous Plant Society 20(4): 6–9.
 Kurup, R., A.J. Johnson, S. Sankar, A.A. Hussain, C.S. Kumar & S. Baby 2013. Fluorescent prey traps in carnivorous plants. Plant Biology 15(3): 611–615. 
 Lavarack, P.S. 1977.  Carnivorous Plant Newsletter 6(3): 49–50.
 Lavarack, P.S. 1981.  Carnivorous Plant Newsletter 10(3): 69–72, 74–76.
 Lee, C.C. 2000. Recent Nepenthes Discoveries. [video] The 3rd Conference of the International Carnivorous Plant Society, San Francisco, USA.
  Liang, R., J. Xie, X. Chen, Shui, S. Wu & Y. Liu 2005. 猪笼草组织培养育苗技术的研究. [Study on the tissue culture and breeding technology of Nepenthes mirabilis.] Journal of Guangdong Landscape Architecture 28(2): 35–37.
  Liang, J., Z. Lu, W. Wang, C. Lin, Q. Guo & G. Liang 2008. 猪笼草离体培养及植株再生研究. [Studies on in vitro culture and plant regeneration in Nepenthes mirabilis.] Journal of Southwest China Normal University (Natural Science) 33(3): 95–98.
  Lisawati, Y. 2005. Uji aktivitas immunomodulator tumbuhan kantong semar (Nepenthes mirablis. L). Working paper, Andalas University, Padang. Abstract 
  Lvqing, Q., F. Feng & H. Li 2003. 猪笼草组培快繁技术的研究. [Tissue culture and rapid propagation of Nepenthes mirabilis.] Journal of Southwest Agricultural University 25(1): 11–13.
 Macfarlane, J.M. 1914. Family XCVI. Nepenthaceæ. [pp. 279–288] In: J.S. Gamble. Materials for a flora of the Malayan Peninsula, No. 24. Journal & Proceedings of the Asiatic Society of Bengal 75(3): 279–391.
  Mansur, M. 2001.  In: Prosiding Seminar Hari Cinta Puspa dan Satwa Nasional. Lembaga Ilmu Pengetahuan Indonesia, Bogor. pp. 244–253.
  Mansur, M. 2007. Keanekaragaman jenis Nepenthes (kantong semar) dataran rendah di Kalimantan Tengah. [Diversity of lowland Nepenthes (kantong semar) in Central Kalimantan.] Berita Biologi 8(5): 335–341. Abstract
  Mardhiana, Y. Parto, R. Hayati & D.P. Priadi 2012. Karakteristik dan kemelimpahan Nepenthes di habitat miskin unsur hara. [The characteristics and abundance of Nepenthes of nutrient-poor habitats.] Jurnal Lahan Suboptimal 1(1): 50–56. Abstract 
 Masters, M.T. 1872. The cultivated species of Nepenthes. The Gardeners' Chronicle and Agricultural Gazette 1872(16): 540–542.
 Masters, M.T. 1882. New garden plants. Nepenthes Kennedyana. The Gardeners' Chronicle, new series, 17(426): 257.
 Meimberg, H., A. Wistuba, P. Dittrich & G. Heubl 2001. Molecular phylogeny of Nepenthaceae based on cladistic analysis of plastid trnK intron sequence data. Plant Biology 3(2): 164–175. 
  Meimberg, H. 2002.  Ph.D. thesis, Ludwig Maximilian University of Munich, Munich.
 Meimberg, H. & G. Heubl 2006. Introduction of a nuclear marker for phylogenetic analysis of Nepenthaceae. Plant Biology 8(6): 831–840. 
 Meimberg, H., S. Thalhammer, A. Brachmann & G. Heubl 2006. Comparative analysis of a translocated copy of the trnK intron in carnivorous family Nepenthaceae. Molecular Phylogenetics and Evolution 39(2): 478–490. 
 Merbach, M.A., G. Zizka, B. Fiala, U. Maschwitz & W.E. Booth 2001. Patterns of nectar secretion in five Nepenthes species from Brunei Darussalam, Northwest Borneo, and implications for ant-plant relationships. Flora 196: 153–160. 
 Mey, F.S. 2010.  Cambodian Journal of Natural History 2010(2): 106–117.
 Mey, F.S. 2012. Under a blazing sun in Vietnam. Strange Fruits: A Garden's Chronicle, December 22, 2012.
 Mithöfer, A. 2011. Carnivorous pitcher plants: insights in an old topic. Phytochemistry 72(13): 1678–1682. 
 Moore, D. 1872. On the culture of Nepenthes at Glasnevin. The Gardeners' Chronicle and Agricultural Gazette 1872(11): 359–360.
 Moran, J.A., W.E. Booth & J.K. Charles 1999.  Annals of Botany 83: 521–528.
 Mullins, J. & M. Jebb 2009. Phylogeny and biogeography of the genus Nepenthes. National Botanic Gardens, Glasnevin. 
  Murniati, Syamswisna & A. Nurdini 2013. Pembuatan flash card dari hasil inventarisasi Nepenthes di hutan adat desa Teluk Bakung. Jurnal Pendidikan dan Pembelajaran 2(1): [unpaginated; 14 pp.] Abstract 
 Normawati, Y. 2002. The effect of stem length on pitcher and inflorescence production in Nepenthes gracilis and Nepenthes mirabilis at Serendah Selangor. B.Sc. Thesis. Universiti Kebangsaan Malaysia.
 Osunkoya, O.O., S.D. Daud & F.L. Wimmer 2008. Longevity, lignin content and construction cost of the assimilatory organs of Nepenthes species. Annals of Botany 102(5): 845–853. 
 Pavlovič, A., E. Masarovičová & J. Hudák 2007. Carnivorous syndrome in Asian pitcher plants of the genus Nepenthes. Annals of Botany 100(3): 527–536. 
 Renner, T. & C.D. Specht 2011. A sticky situation: assessing adaptations for plant carnivory in the Caryophyllales by means of stochastic character mapping. International Journal of Plant Sciences 172(7): 889–901. 
 Renner, T. & C.D. Specht 2012. Molecular and functional evolution of class I chitinases for plant carnivory in the Caryophyllales. Molecular Biology and Evolution 29(10): 2971–2985. 
 Rice, B. 2007. Carnivorous plants with hybrid trapping strategies. Carnivorous Plant Newsletter 36(1): 23–27.
 Ridley, H.N. 1916. Nepenthaceæ. [pp. 139–141] In: I. Report on the botany of the Wollaston Expedition to Dutch New Guinea, 1912–13. The Transactions of the Linnean Society of London, series 2: botany, 9(1): 1–269. 
 Rottloff, S., R. Stieber, H. Maischak, F.G. Turini, G. Heubl & A. Mithöfer 2011. Functional characterization of a class III acid endochitinase from the traps of the carnivorous pitcher plant genus, Nepenthes. Journal of Experimental Botany 62(13): 4639–4647. 
 Schulze, W., E.D. Schulze, J.S. Pate, A.N. Gillison 1997. The nitrogen supply from soils and insects during growth of the pitcher plants Nepenthes mirabilis, Cephalotus follicularis and Darlingtonia californica. Oecologia 112(4): 464–471. 
 Som, R.M. 1988. Systematic studies on Nepenthes species and hybrids in the Malay Peninsula. Ph.D. thesis. Universiti Kebangsaan Malaysia.
  Syamsuardi & R. Tamin 1994. Kajian kekerabatan jenis-jenis Nepenthes di Sumatera Barat. Project report, Andalas University, Padang. Abstract 
  Syamsuardi 1995. Klasifikasi numerik kantong semar (Nepenthes) di Sumatera Barat. [Numerical classification of pitcher plants (Nepenthes) in West Sumatra.] Journal Matematika dan Pengetahuan Alam 4(1): 48–57. Abstract 
  Tang L., Ji K., Wang Y. & Chen J. 2010. 猪笼草消化液中蛋白酶的活性初探. [Preliminary study on the activities of protease in digestive juice of pitcher plant.] Genomics and Applied Biology 29(2): 293–297. Abstract
  Uji, T. 2003. Keanekaragaman dan potensi flora di Cagar Alam Muara Kendawangan, Kalimantan Barat. [Flora diversity and its potential in Muara Kendawangan Nature Reserve, West Kalimantan.] Biodiversitas 4(1): 112–117. 
 Wilson, G.W., F. Venter, R.F. Wilson & D. Crayn 2011. Chasing Nepenthes on Cape York, Queensland. Carnivorous Plant Newsletter 40(4): 122–128.
  Wu T. & Ye C. 2000. 雷州半岛野生猪笼草资源及其栽培利用的研究. [Research on the resources and its culture & utility available of wild Nepenthes mirabilis(Lour.) Druce in Leizhou Peninsular.] Journal of Zhanjiang Normal College 21(2): 15–16. Abstract
  Wu T., Ye C. & Zhang X. 2000. 猪笼草叶的形态解剖结构研究. [Studies on the anatomical structures of the leaf of Nepenthes mirabilis (Lour.) Druce.] Guihaia 20(2): 153–155. Abstract
  Xie, Y., X. Xie, L. Qiu & Y. Huang 2007. 猪笼草组培快繁技术研究. [Tissue culture and rapid propagation of Nepenthes mirabilis.] Guangxi Agricultural Sciences 38(2): 131–132.
  Xu C. 2003. 猪笼草. [A review in research of Nepenthes.] Chinese Journal of Tropical Agriculture 23(5): 53–59. Abstract
  Yogiara 2004.  M.Sc. thesis, Bogor Agricultural University, Bogor.
 Ziemer, R.R. 1988.  Carnivorous Plant Newsletter 17(3): 70–73.
  สงขลา / ขนมหม้อข้าวหม้อแกงลิง ขนมไทยภูมิปัญญาชาวบ้าน. [video] 77 NationChannel.

External links

 Hong Kong Herbarium: Nepenthes mirabilis
 N. mirabilis var. globosa in its natural habitat

Carnivorous plants of Asia
Carnivorous plants of Australia
Carnivorous plants of the Pacific
mirabilis
Caryophyllales of Australia
Flora of Indo-China
Flora of Malesia
Flora of China
Flora of Hong Kong
Flora of Queensland
Least concern biota of Queensland

Endangered flora of Australia
Nature Conservation Act endangered biota
Plants described in 1790